Stephen Richard Platt Moulsdale (18 August 1872, County Sligo – 25 October 1944, Hintlesham) was an  Irish Anglican priest and academic administrator.

Life and career
The eldest son of the Revd T. H. P. Moulsdale, an Anglo-Irish cleric who was the rector of Ballysumaghan, Stephen Moulsdale was educated initially in Sligo followed by St Aidan's Theological College in Birkenhead. He was ordained in 1896 and became a curate at St Chad's Church in Everton, Liverpool. Later continuing his studies at Durham University as a member of Bishop Hatfield's Hall, he was granted an MA in Divinity in 1903. Moulsdale married Mary Frideswide, the daughter of Aysgarth School headmaster the Rev. C. T. Hales, in 1908. She died in 1933.

In 1903 he was appointed vice-principal of St Chad's Hostel, Hooton Pagnell, and in 1904 was appointed principal. Also in 1904, he was instrumental in founding St Chad's Hall at Durham University as a sister institution to the hostel, becoming its first principal, which he held concurrently with the hostel principalship. The hostel closed in 1916, with all teaching concentrated at the Durham institution, which in 1918 was renamed St Chad's College.

He remained principal of St Chad's College until 1937, serving concurrently as Vice-Chancellor of Durham University from 1934 to 1936.

References

1872 births
1944 deaths
Principals of St Chad's College, Durham
20th-century English Anglican priests
Alumni of Hatfield College, Durham
Alumni of St Aidans College Birkenhead
20th-century Anglo-Irish people